Louis Léon Jacob (11 November 1768 – 14 March 1854) was a French admiral.

He was born at Tonnay, Charente, was educated at Rochefort, and volunteered from a clerkship in the marine bureau to the navy (1784).  He was promoted to ensign in 1793, served as a lieutenant on the Ça Ira in her fight against a superior British force on 14 March 1795, and was taken prisoner when the ship was captured.

After his release, Jacob was appointed to the frigate Bellone. He took part in the Battle of Tory Island and was again taken prisoner when Bellone surrendered to Ethalion.

Jacob later took part in the campaign in Santo Domingo in 1801, was Captain at Granville (1805), helping Piémontaise in Saint-Servan, capturing two gun-brigs  and  near Chaussey, and after at Naples (1806). He took part in the Battle of Les Sables-d'Olonne. He was made a rear admiral in 1812 and in 1814 defended Rochefort.

He retired on the Restoration, reentered active service in 1820, was Governor of Guadeloupe from 1823 to 1826, prepared the expedition against Morocco and Algiers (1827), served on the Admiralty Board until 1834, when he became Minister of Marine, and was aide-de-camp to Louis Philippe until 1848.  He introduced in 1805 a system of semaphores which was long used in the French navy.

References

 

French Navy admirals
1768 births
1854 deaths
Ministers of Marine and the Colonies
French naval commanders of the Napoleonic Wars
French colonial governors of Guadeloupe